The Golden Globe (Portugal) for Best Newcomer is awarded annually at the Golden Globes (Portugal) to the best Portuguese female athletes of the previous year.

Winners

References 

Awards established in 1996
Golden Globes (Portugal)
Sportsmanship trophies and awards